The Men's J. P. Morgan Tournament of Champions 2013 is the men's edition of the 2013 Tournament of Champions, which is a PSA World Series event Gold (Prize money : 115 000 $). The event took place at the Grand Central Terminal in New York City in the United States from 18 January to 24 January. Ramy Ashour won his third Tournament of Champions trophy, beating Grégory Gaultier in the final.

Prize money and ranking points
For 2013, the prize purse was $115,000. The prize money and points breakdown is as follows:

Seeds

Draw and results

See also
PSA World Tour 2013
Tournament of Champions (squash)

References

External links
PSA Tournament of Champions 2013 website
Tournament of Champions 2013 official website

Tournament of Champions
Tournament of Champions
2013 in sports in New York (state)
Tournament of Champions (squash)